Ren Shou No.1 Middle School is located in Renshou County in Sichuan Province, China. Its predecessor was Ao Feng Academy, founded in 1764. The name was changed into Ao Feng Middle School in 1906 and then to Ren Shou County Middle School in 1939. In 1956 it became Ren Shou No.1 Middle School. It has become the largest middle school in
Ren Shou County and is now a national level demonstrative high school. The school covers an area of 500 mǔ (and the number of academic buildings, office buildings, and dormitories is around 38. There are 393 teachers and about 7,800 students at the school.

Alumni
Famous students include Huang Jiqing, a academician of the Chinese Academy of Sciences, and Yang Rudai, who was vice chairman of the Chinese People's Political Consultative Conference National Committee.

Schools in Sichuan